Grammoceras is an extinct genus of ammonite found in Yorks Ravenscar, England, from Jurassic period sediments.  Its overall distribution is fairly worldwide.

Grammoceras has a thin, discoidally evolute shell with simple, gently sigmoid ribbing and a low ventral keel.  Dumortiera and Catulloceras from the same age are similar except that Dumortiera has a more rounded venter and Catulloceras has a subquadrate whorl section.  Asthenoceras from the slightly younger lower Bajocian may be a subgenus.

References

 

Ammonitida
Ammonites of Europe
Jurassic ammonites
Toarcian life
Ammonite genera